Kaniz Fatema Roksana was the first Bangladeshi woman commercial pilot. She died on  5 August 1984 in a plane crash in a marsh near Shahjalal International Airport in Dhaka.  With a total death toll of 49 people, it is the deadliest aviation disaster to occur on Bangladeshi soil. She was licensed as a commercial pilot in 1977.

See also
 1984 Biman Bangladesh Airlines Fokker F27 crash

References

1984 deaths
Aviators killed in aviation accidents or incidents in Bangladesh
Bangladeshi women aviators
Women commercial aviators
Victims of aviation accidents or incidents in 1984